Varför är solen så röd is a studio album by Christer Sjögren, released on 21 October 1996.

The album was recorded in Miami, and produced by Ramón Arcusa, also producer for Julio Iglesias. The album sold over 110 000 copies, and Christer Sjögren carried out a concert tour across Sweden and Norway, with songs from the album.

The song "Cecilia" charted at Svensktoppen for one week (14 December 1996). "Jag älskar dig än" received a Svensktoppen test on 22 February 1997. but failed to enter chart.

Track listing
Varför är solen så röd (Quando calienta el sol)
Vi ska lära för livet (Quiereme mucho)
Quando, Quando, Quando
Jag älskar dig än
Ännu en dag (Johnny Guitar)
Crying in the Moonlight (Månsken i augusti)
Jag vill dansa med dig
San Martinho
Kärlekens vind (Lambada)
Vaya Con Dios
Cecilia
Jamaica (Jamaica: Jamaica Farewell)

Contributors
Dan Werner - guitar
Nicky Orta - bass
Tim Divine, keyboard
Lee Levin - drums
Tony Concepcion, trumpet

Charts

References 

1996 albums
Christer Sjögren albums